Delamere is a locality in the Australian state of South Australia located on the south coast of the Fleurieu Peninsula about  south of the state capital of Adelaide and about  south-west of the municipal seat of Yankalilla. It includes what was once a neighbouring village of Bullaparinga.

The 2016 Australian census which was conducted in August 2016 reports that Delamere had a population of 149 people.

It is named after Delamere in Cheshire, England.

Delamere is located within the federal division of Mayo, the state electoral district of Mawson and the local government area of the District Council of Yankalilla.

References

Towns in South Australia
Fleurieu Peninsula